Trigonostoma is a genus of sea snails, marine gastropod mollusks in the family Cancellariidae, the nutmeg snails.

Trigonostoma is also the name given to a trematode genus in the family Aspidogastridae, that is actually a synonym of the genus Multicalyx Faust & Tang, 1936

Species
According to the World Register of Marine Species (WoRMS) the following species with valid names are included within the genus Trigonostoma :
 
 † Trigonostoma ampullaceum (Brocchi, 1814) 
 Trigonostoma antiquatum (Hinds, 1843) - antique nutmeg
 † Trigonostoma barnardi A. W. Janssen, 1984 
 Trigonostoma breve (G.B. Sowerby I, 1832a)
 Trigonostoma bullatum (G.B. Sowerby I, 1832a) - bubble nutmeg 
 Trigonostoma chui Yen, 1936
 Trigonostoma diamantinum Garrard, 1975
 Trigonostoma elegantulum (M. Smith, 1947) little elegant nutmeg
 † Trigonostoma exampullaceum (Sacco, 1894) 
 †  Trigonostoma exgeslini (Sacco, 1894) 
 †  Trigonostoma extractrix (Boettger, 1906) 
 Trigonostoma gofasi Verhecken, 2007
 Trigonostoma goniostoma (G.B. Sowerby I, 1832a) - angle-mouth nutmeg 
 Trigonostoma iota Garrard, 1975
 Trigonostoma kilburni Petit & Harasewych, 2000
 Trigonostoma lamberti (Souverbie, 1870 in Souverbie & Montrouzier)
 Trigonostoma laseroni (Iredale, 1936) - Laseron's nutmeg 
 † Trigonostoma lindeni A. W. Janssen, 1984 
 Trigonostoma milleri (Burch, 1949) - Miller's nutmeg 
 Trigonostoma mozambicense Petit & Harasewych, 2002
 Trigonostoma nitidum (A. Adams, 1855)
 † Trigonostoma parvotriangula Sacco, 1894 
 † Trigonostoma protrigonostoma (Sacco, 1894) 
 † Trigonostoma pseudumbilicare Peyrot, 1928 
 Trigonostoma pygmaeum (C.B. Adams, 1852)
 Trigonostoma rugosum (Lamarck, 1822)
 Trigonostoma scala (Gmelin, 1791)
 Trigonostoma scalare (Gmelin, 1791)
 † Trigonostoma schroeckingeri (R. Hoernes & Auinger, 1890) 
 Trigonostoma semidisjunctum (G.B. Sowerby II, 1849a) - disjunct nutmeg 
 † Trigonostoma subsuturale (d'Orbigny, 1852) 
 Trigonostoma tenerum (Philippi, 1848) - Philippi's nutmeg 
 Trigonostoma tessella Garrard, 1975
 Trigonostoma thysthlon Petit & Harasewych, 1987
 Trigonostoma tryblium Bouchet & Petit, 2008
 Trigonostoma tuberculosum (G.B. Sowerby I, 1832a)
 † Trigonostoma umbilicare'' (Brocchi, 1814) 

 Subgenus Trigonostoma Blainville, 1825
 Trigonostoma pellucida - triangular nutmeg

 Species brought into synonymy
 Trigonostoma bicolor (Hinds, 1843) : synonym of Scalptia bicolor (Hinds, 1843)
 Trigonostoma campbelli Shasky, 1961 accepted as Axelella campbelli (Shasky, 1961)
 † Trigonostoma christiei Finlay, 1924 accepted as † Scalptia christiei (Finlay, 1924) 
 Trigonostoma costiferum (G.B. Sowerby I, 1832): synonym of Scalptia costifera (G. B. Sowerby I, 1832)
 Trigonostoma damasoi T. Cossignani, 2015 accepted as Trigonostoma gofasi Verhecken, 2007
 Trigonostoma foveolata [sic]: synonym of Scalptia foveolata (G.B. Sowerby II, 1849)
 Trigonostoma rugosum (Lamarck, 1822) accepted as Bivetopsia rugosa (Lamarck, 1822)
 Trigonostoma scalariformis (Lamarck, 1822) accepted as Scalptia scalariformis (Lamarck, 1822)
 Trigonostoma semidisjuncta [sic]: synonym of Trigonostoma semidisjunctum (G.B. Sowerby II, 1849)
 † Trigonostoma thisbe Olsson, 1964 accepted as † Ventrilia thisbe (Olsson, 1964) 
 † Trigonostoma triumpha Olsson, 1964 accepted as † Ventrilia triumpha (Olsson, 1964)
 Trigonostoma tuberculosa [sic]: synonym of Trigonostoma tuberculosum (G.B. Sowerby I, 1832)
 Trigonostoma vinnulum Iredale, 1925: synonym of Trigonaphera vinnulum (Iredale, 1925) (original combination)
 † Trigonostoma waikaiaensis Finlay, 1924 accepted as  † Scalptia waikaiaensis (Finlay, 1924)

References

 Hemmen J. (2007). Recent Cancellariidae.Annotated and illustrated catalogue of Recent Cancellariidae. Privately published, Wiesbaden. 428 pp.
 Bouchet P. & Petit R.E. (2008). New species and new records of southwest Pacific Cancellariidae.'' The Nautilus 122(1): 1-18.

External links
 Perry, G. (1811). Conchology, or the natural history of shells: containing a new arrangement of the genera and species, illustrated by coloured engravings executed from the natural specimens, and including the latest discoveries. 4 pp., 61 plates. London
 Blainville, H. M. D. de. (1825-1827). Manuel de malacologie et de conchyliologie. Paris, Levrault 1-647
 Iredale, T. (1936). Australian molluscan notes, no. 2. Records of the Australian Museum. 19(5): 267-340, pls 20-24

Cancellariidae
Gastropod genera